Nephropsis rosea, sometimes called the rosy lobsterette or two-toned lobsterette, is a species of lobster.

Distribution and habitat
It is found in the Caribbean Sea and Gulf of Mexico, and as far north in the western Atlantic Ocean as Bermuda, and as far south as Guiana.

Size

References

True lobsters
Crustaceans of the Atlantic Ocean
Crustaceans described in 1888
Arthropods of the Dominican Republic